Turkey participated at the 2015 European Games, in Baku, Azerbaijan from 12 to 28 June 2015.

191 Turkish athletes (110 men and 81 women) competed in 23 sports.

Medals by sport

Medalists

Archery

Badminton

Basketball (3x3)

 Men's team – 1 team of 4 athletes
 Women's team – 1 team of 4 athletes

Men's tournament
Team

Ahmet Yılmaz
Enver Ekmen
Hasan Aksoyak
Kıvanç Dinler

Group Play

Eighth Finals

Boxing

Canoe sprint

Cycling

Road cycling

Mountain biking

Diving

Fencing

Gymnastics

Artistic
Men
Team

Individual

Apparatus

Women
Individual

Judo

Men's

Women's

Karate

Men's

Women's

Sambo

Shooting

Swimming

Synchronised swimming

Table tennis

Taekwondo

Men's

Women's

Triathlon

Volleyball

Indoor volleyball
 Men's team – 1 team of 14 athletes
 Women's team – 1 team of 14 athletes

Turkish women became champions beating the Polish team 3–0 at the final.

Beach volleyball

Water Polo

 Men's team – 1 team of 13 athletes

Wrestling

Men's Greco-Roman

Men's freestyle

Women's freestyle

References

Nations at the 2015 European Games
European Games
2015